The  IIFA Special Effects is a technical award chosen ahead of the ceremonies.

The winners are listed below:

See also 
 IIFA Awards
 Bollywood
 Cinema of India

External links
 2008 winners 

Film awards for Best Visual Effects
International Indian Film Academy Awards